John McCrae Secondary School is a public secondary school in the Nepean district of Ottawa, Ontario, Canada.
It supports grades 9-12. Built in 1999, it was the public high school in Barrhaven, replacing its predecessor, Confederation High School.
John McCrae is attached to the Walter Baker Sports Centre.
It offers an array of activities for students such as squash, swimming, weightlifting and a library.

The school is built on a hill in a residential neighbourhood in old Barrhaven.

The school is named for Lieutenant Colonel John Alexander McCrae, MD, a Canadian poet and doctor during World War I who wrote the famous war memorial poem "In Flanders Fields".

The school used to perform a musical every other year.  Past years musicals have included "Lucky Stiff", "Zombie Prom", "High School Musical"", "The Butler did it Singing", and "Back to the 80s". In 2015, the school performed its last musical, "Hair The Musical".

Sports
John McCrae has a variety of sports teams, including curling, field hockey, golf, hockey, field lacrosse, rugby, soccer, touch football, football, track and field, swimming, varsity girls rugby, varsity girls touch football, tennis, water polo, badminton, and baseball. In 2012, the senior boys soccer team won the OFSAA championships after an undefeated season.

Athletic awards are given out annually, including Athlete of the Year (for each gender and age category), Bulldog Award, Spirit of the Bulldog, the Alexa Sirenko Athletic Award, and the True Sport Award-team award.

Programs
A Link Crew program is part of John McCrae's school culture. Members of this group mentor incoming Grade 9 students and also organize school-wide events throughout the year, such as the Haunted House, Remembrance Day Ceremony, and Santa's Workshop.

John McCrae is the only school in the OCDSB to offer the High Performance Athlete program, which "supports the educational accommodations of students who are striving to compete at the Provincial, National and International level in their respective sports. It was put in place in recognition that these talented student athletes required unique programming accommodation and flexibility so that they may attain the high standards demanded in their field and still receive a high quality education."

John McCrae has an extensive art program. On multiple occasions each year, the Red Poppy Gallery showcases artworks by students from the advanced art classes open to anyone starting in grade 11. This includes the annual Grad Showcase, where art students from the grade 12 art classes get to display their paintings and art projects to the public.

Clubs
Model United Nations
Art Club
Concert Band
The Core (Christian fellowship)
Chess and Strategy Club
Eco Club
Free The Children
Fandom Club
Gay-Straight Alliance (GSA)
Jazz Band
Jewish Culture Club
Junior Achievement
Link Crew
Live It Up
Multicultural Club
Peer Tutoring
Philosophy Club
Reach for the Top
Robotics Club
Student Action Group
Thread works
Various Combo Bands
Yearbook Club
The Grade 12 Drama Class Stages A Play Most Years

Sports Teams

Fall Sports (September - November) 

 Sr Girls Basketball
 Jr Girls Basketball
 Sr Boys Volleyball
 Sr Boys Soccer
 Jr Boys Soccer
 Girls Field Hockey
 X-Country Running
 Golf
 Girls Rugby 7's
 Boys Rugby 7's
 Boys Non-Contact Hockey

Winter Sports (November - March) 

 Sr Boys Basketball
 Jr Boys Basketball
 Sr Girls Volleyball
 Jr Girls Volleyball
 Jr Boys Volleyball
 Nordic Skiing
 Curling
 Girls Hockey
 Girls Ringette
 Swimming
 Badminton

Spring Sports (April - June) 

 Sr Boys Rugby
 Girls Rugby
 Jr Boys Rugby
 Girls Touch Football
 Sr Girls Soccer
 Jr Girls Soccer
 Track and Field
 Ultimate
 Boys Baseball
 Girls Softball
 Boys Lacrosse

Students Councils 
John McCrae Secondary School has an active and engaged student council, which plays an important role in the school's community. The council is made up of elected representatives from each grade, who work together to organize events and initiatives that promote school spirit and student involvement.

The student council is responsible for organizing a variety of events throughout the school year, such as dances, pep rallies, charity fundraisers, and other special events. They also work to promote student engagement in the school community by providing opportunities for students to give feedback and share their ideas.

In addition to planning events, the student council also works to support various school clubs and teams by providing funding and resources. They also represent the student body in discussions with school administration, helping to ensure that student voices are heard and that their concerns are addressed.

There are several Councils in the school:
 The Student Council
 The Athletic Council
 The Music Council

See also
List of high schools in Ontario
List of Ottawa schools

References

External links
School Website

High schools in Ottawa
Educational institutions established in 1999
1999 establishments in Ontario